National Route 44 is a national highway in South Korea connects Yangpyeong County to Yangyang County. It established on 31 August 1971.

Main stopovers

 Gyeonggi Province
 Yangpyeong County
 Gangwon Province
 Hongcheon County - Inje County - Yangyang County

Major intersections

 (■): Motorway
IS: Intersection, IC: Interchange

Gyeonggi Province

Gangwon Province

References

44
Roads in Gyeonggi
Roads in Gangwon